These are the official results of the Women's High Jump event at the 1982 European Championships in Athens, Greece, held at the Olympic Stadium "Spiros Louis" on 7 and 8 September 1982.

Medalists

Results

Final
8 September

Qualification
7 September

Participation
According to an unofficial count, 19 athletes from 15 countries participated in the event.

 (1)
 (1)
 (2)
 (1)
 (1)
 (2)
 (1)
 (2)
 (1)
 (1)
 (1)
 (1)
 (1)
 (2)
 (1)

See also
 1978 Women's European Championships High Jump (Prague)
 1980 Women's Olympic High Jump (Moscow)
 1983 Women's World Championships High Jump (Helsinki)
 1984 Women's Olympic High Jump (Los Angeles)
 1986 Women's European Championships High Jump (Stuttgart)
 1987 Women's World Championships High Jump (Rome)
 1988 Women's Olympic High Jump (Seoul)

References

 Results

High jump
High jump at the European Athletics Championships
1982 in women's athletics